Vello is an Estonian masculine given name. People named Vello include:

Vello Asi (1927–2016), interior architect, graphic designer and professor 
Vello Helk (1923–2014), Danish historian of Estonian origin
Vello Jürna (1959–2007), opera singer
Vello Kaaristo (1911–1965), cross-country skier
Vello Lään (born 1937), journalist
Vello Leito (born 1941), politician
Vello Lõugas (1937–1998), archaeologist
Vello Orumets (born 1941), singer
Vello Pähn (born 1958), conductor 
Vello Pärnpuu (born 1973), wrestler
Vello Rummo (1921–2009), theatre director
Vello Saatpalu (1935–2013), engineer, politician and sport sailor
Vello Salo (1925–2019), clergyman, theologist, writer and translator
Vello Salum (1933–2015), Lutheran clergyman, Soviet dissident and politician
Vello Toomemets (:et) (born 1954), musician and composer
 (born 1951), Buddhist, artist and freedom fighter
 (1923–2007), Soviet military commander
Vello Viisimaa (1928–1991), opera singer and actor
Vello Vinn (born 1939), printmaker and artist
Vello is also the name of an austrian bicycle brand from Vienna - VELLO bike.

See also
Santhara Vello (born 1972), Malaysian cricketer

Estonian masculine given names